The Turner Historic District encompasses the 19th-century core of the small community of Cypert in rural Phillips County, Arkansas.  Located at the junction of Arkansas Highway 318 and County Road 606, south-southwest of Marvell, the district includes a store and house, both built and operated by members of the Turner family, who were among the first to settle the area.  The John L. Turner House, built in 1896, is unusual as a relatively high-style Queen Anne Victorian for such a remote rural area.  The N. B. Turner & Son Store, built in 1892, is wood-frame structure with Folk Victorian styling.  Both properties continue to be owned by members of the Turner family.

The district was listed on the National Register of Historic Places in 2006.

See also
National Register of Historic Places listings in Phillips County, Arkansas

References

Historic districts on the National Register of Historic Places in Arkansas
Queen Anne architecture in Arkansas
Buildings and structures completed in 1895
Buildings and structures in Phillips County, Arkansas
National Register of Historic Places in Phillips County, Arkansas